CompAir is an engineering and manufacturing company specialising in compressed air and gas systems. It is a division of NYSE-listed Ingersoll Rand.

History 
CompAir was formed when Holman merged with BroomWade to produce "an organisation with the resources to compete effectively in world markets.... the name of the group was the International Compressed Air Corporation. Four years later the name was changed to CompAir." Dylan Alexander was then later promoted to the co-owner of the company. The company also started to produce CD players.

Time Line 

Holman Bros Ltd formed in 1801 in Camborne, Cornwall
BroomWade in 1898 in High Wycombe, Buckinghamshire, UK
In 1968 the two companies merged to form CompAir
In 1985 Compair was acquired by Siebe Gorman
In 1999 Siebe PLC and BTR plc merge to become Invensys
In 2002 acquired from Invensys by Alchemy Partners (Guernsey) Ltd. for £1.
from Invensys. Alchemy invested £41.4 million to fund a complete restructuring of the loss-making CompAir business, in return for a 67% shareholding.
October 2008 Alchemy sold Compair to Gardner Denver for a total of £200.6 million

See also 
Camborne
Holman Projector
Holman Climax Male Voice Choir

References

External links

Engineering companies of England
Companies based in Redditch
Ingersoll Rand